Hollow Water First Nation ( also spelt as Wanipigow) is an Anishinaabe (Ojibwa) First Nation located on the east side of Lake Winnipeg, Canada,  north of Pine Falls, Manitoba, and  north of Winnipeg.

The main economic base of the community remains hunting, fishing, trapping and wild rice harvesting.

Hole or Hollow Water 10 
The reserve is adjacent to and bounded in the southwest by Seymourville, and across the river from Aghaming.

Governance
Hollow Water First Nation is governed by the Act Electoral System of government. The current leadership, is Chief Larry Barker and four Councilors: Furlon Barker, Geoffrey Bushie, Henry Moneas, and Maurice Williams.

Hollow Water First Nation is a member of the Southeast Resource Development Council and a signatory to Treaty 5.

Former Chiefs of the Hollow Water First Nation include Rod Bushie, who was later elected Grand Chief of Assembly of Manitoba Chiefs in August 1997.

References

External links
 AANDC profile
 Map of Hole or Hollow Water 10 at Statcan

Southeast Resource Development Council
First Nations governments in Manitoba
Anishinaabe peoples
Saulteaux

First Nations in Northern Region, Manitoba